The men's 4 × 400 metres relay at the 2018 IAAF World Indoor Championships took place on 3 and 4 March 2018.

Summary
In the heats, the Dominican Republic rested their star, disqualified silver medalist Luguelín Santos.  They didn't qualify and Santos did not get to run the final.  Similarly, USA was able to rest their stars, Michael Cherry and Aldrich Bailey while successfully qualifying for the final.
In the final, USA was out fast with Fred Kerley having a marginal edge at the break, but extending it by running an efficient tangent from lane 6, netting himself a 3-metre lead over Poland's Karol Zalewski.  Zalewski kept that gap for most of the second lap, losing a little ground in the handoff.  Kerley's split 44.84.  The Borlée brothers, represented by Dylan Borlée, representing Belgium were an equal gap back.  With an efficient handoff to Michael Cherry, USA gained another 3 metres.  Through the second leg, Rafał Omelko chipped away at Cherry's lead, by the time the handoff took place, the gap between USA and Poland was back to 3 metres.  Behind them, Jereem Richards brought Trinidad and Tobago past Jonathan Borlée and approached passing Omelko before fading back.  Cherry's split was 45.39.  The third leg for USA was Aldrich Bailey, vs Poland's Łukasz Krawczuk, Bailey lost another meter as Poland, Trinidad and Tobago and Belgium gained.  Bailey's split 46.10.  After taking the baton, USA's Vernon Norwood accelerated to open another metre.  Behind him, Poland's Jakub Krzewina led the pursuers, with TTO's Lalonde Gordon and Belgium's Kevin Borlée in close order.  By the end of the first lap, Norwood had extended the lead to 5 metres, but down the final backstretch, the lead began to shrink.  Coming off the final turn, Krzewina had a burst of speed, Norwood straightened up and tightened up, Krzewina went by.  Five metres back Borlée was attempting a similar move on Gordon, without as much authority.  In a tight battle for bronze, Borlée was able to outlearn Gordon.

Poland's winning time was a new world indoor record, beating USA's team from four years earlier.  The final split was timed at 45.44 from when Norwood crossed the line, but considering he made up at least three metres, Krzewina's time was considerably faster.  Behind them, Belgium and Trinidad and Tobago set national records.

The Poland 4x400 meter relay team not only made themselves astonished by this unbelievable record, but they astonished everyone in attendance and the world. This world record was the first world record ever set for the IAAF World Indoor Championships. The four men on the relay team, were originally going for the European world record, and not only did they beat that record, but they also beat the indoor world record for the men's 4x400 meter relay. What makes this event even more astonishing, was the fact that the U.S.A. team had also beaten the previous world record for the men's indoor 4x400 meter relay, but were just shy of setting the record themselves after falling short to Poland's team. The previous record was previously held by the United States, and in an unbelievable fashion both teams managed to beat this record in a tight race, the previous time being 3:02.14 from 2014. This amazing accomplishment was not only the new IAAF World Indoor Championship record, but also the indoor world record, truly an astonishing accomplishment.

Results

Heats
The heats were started on 3 March at 12:32.

Final

The final was started on 4 March at 15:58.

References

4 x 400 metres relay
4 × 400 metres relay at the World Athletics Indoor Championships
2018 in men's athletics